Machala is a city in south-west Ecuador. 

Machala may also refer to:

 Machala Canton, a canton of Ecuador, located in the El Oro Province.
 Machala (song), song by Carter Efe and Beri Tiga.
 Oldřich Machala.
 Roman Catholic Diocese of Machala.
 Our Lady of Mercy Cathedral, Machala.

See also